"He Is Risen" is the 34th episode of the HBO original series The Sopranos and the eighth of the show's third season. It was written by Robin Green, Mitchell Burgess and Todd A. Kessler, and directed by Allen Coulter, and originally aired on April 15, 2001.

Starring
 James Gandolfini as Tony Soprano
 Lorraine Bracco as Dr. Jennifer Melfi
 Edie Falco as Carmela Soprano
 Michael Imperioli as Christopher Moltisanti
 Dominic Chianese as Corrado Soprano, Jr.
 Steven Van Zandt as Silvio Dante
 Tony Sirico as Paulie Gualtieri
 Robert Iler as Anthony Soprano, Jr.
 Jamie-Lynn Sigler as Meadow Soprano
 Drea de Matteo as Adriana La Cerva
 Aida Turturro as Janice Soprano
 John Ventimiglia as Artie Bucco
 Robert Funaro as Eugene Pontecorvo
 Joe Pantoliano as Ralph Cifaretto

Guest starring
 Jerry Adler as Hesh Rabkin

Also guest starring

Synopsis
Carmela and Rosalie notice the budding relationship between Meadow and Jackie Jr.; Rosalie is thrilled. At a frat-house mixer, he gives her free Ecstasy. Later, they are together on her bed; doped and drunk, she falls asleep; he slightly lifts her clothes but goes no further. On a date, they make out in his car. Meadow warns Jackie that their relationship is unlikely to go anywhere at the moment. On another evening, an over-excited Meadow takes Jackie's car and wrecks it. She is unharmed, but he is deeply concerned and she asks to spend the night with him instead of being driven home.

In Dr. Melfi's waiting room Tony finds another patient, Gloria Trillo, speaking on the phone. He hears that she works as a saleswoman at a Mercedes-Benz dealership. They have been double-booked and he gives her the appointment. Later, he visits the dealership and she accompanies him on a test drive. They end up in bed on Tony's boat. Gloria calls Melfi to cancel a session. Melfi hears a man's voice in the background.

Ralphie is intentionally disrespectful to Tony when they meet. Each is thinking of killing the other. Johnny Sack passes messages between them, amending the messages to bring about a reconciliation. At Nuovo Vesuvio, Ralphie abjectly apologizes to Tony for all his past behavior, including his killing of Tracee, and blames his actions on his cocaine use. Tony barely acknowledges him. Johnny tells Ralphie that Tony was only "posturing." He has suggested to Tony that he could promote Ralphie to capo in place of Gigi, but Tony is reluctant. Gigi soon dies of a heart attack on the toilet; Ralphie is the best choice to succeed him. He is relieved and joyous when Tony tells him of the promotion. Then he asks whether he's being promoted on merit or just to replace Gigi. Tony does not answer. He walks away when Ralphie suggests they have a drink together.

First appearances
 Gloria Trillo: a therapy patient of Dr. Melfi's and a car saleswoman at Globe Motors.
 Little Paulie Germani: Paulie Gualtieri's nephew and crew member.
 Aaron Arkaway: Janice's Christian boyfriend who suffers from narcolepsy.

Deceased
 Gigi Cestone: dies of a heart attack while on the toilet at the Aprile crew hangout.

Title reference
 It is a reference to Aaron, Janice's narcoleptic, evangelical boyfriend, who asks Jackie Jr. if he has heard "the good news, He is risen".
 This episode originally aired on Easter Sunday.
The title is also a reference to Ralph being finally promoted to Capo of the Aprile crew.

Cultural references
 When Tony tells Carmela to disinvite Ralphie and Ro for Thanksgiving dinner, he references The Jetsons, stating Ralph's not going to Mr. Spacely's house for dinner.
Tony, Hugh, A.J., and Chris watch the annual Detroit Lions Thanksgiving game, during which Janice claims that she served Barry Sanders when she was a waitress at Kenny Rogers.
 Silvio warns Tony that Ralph is the type to pull a "Jack Ruby" on you, referring to the sneak-attacking shooter of Lee Harvey Oswald.
 When Jackie Junior comes into Ro's kitchen, Ralph greets him, "Oh, Fabian!"
 The deaths of Elvis Presley and Don Simpson. At the funeral of Gigi Cestone (who dies of heart failure while on the toilet), all are in agreement that Gigi's death, while natural, was arguably one of the most embarrassing ways to go. Anthony Soprano states that it's "how Elvis went." Silvio Dante mistakenly replies, "That guy in Hollywood, too. 'Don' something. Producer of The Simpsons."
 Tony references Sun Tzu's The Art of War on a couple of occasions.
 Tony references "Prince Matchabelli" when he intends to reference Machiavelli's The Prince.
 Speaking to Tony about Gigi's crew, Uncle Junior says, "For them he's a Ghibelline, coming to butt in." The Ghibellines were a political and military faction in 13th- and 14th-century Italy.

Music
 The song at the party where Jackie is selling Ecstasy and meets Meadow is "Touch Me" by Taskforce (Thrillseekers Remix).
 When Ralphie turns his back on Tony at the casino, the song playing on the jukebox is "Ghost Riders in the Sky" by The Ramrods. 
 Prior to this, "Rag Doll" from The Four Seasons is played. The lead singer of The Four Seasons, Frankie Valli appeared later in season 5.
 The music playing at Gigi's funeral is Adagio in G minor by Tomaso Albinoni (also played at Livia's funeral in "Proshai, Livushka").
 The song "Whoa!" by Black Rob is played in the episode.
 The song played over the end credits is "The Captain" by Kasey Chambers.

References

External links
"He Is Risen" at HBO

The Sopranos (season 3) episodes
2001 American television episodes
Television episodes directed by Allen Coulter